A statue of Pierre Charles L'Enfant represents Washington, D.C., in the U.S. Capitol Building.  L'Enfant was a French-American military engineer who designed the basic plan for Washington, D.C. known today as the L'Enfant Plan (1791).

References

Monuments and memorials in Washington, D.C.
Sculptures of men in Washington, D.C.
Statues in Washington, D.C.